Curraheen is the name of townlands in several counties in Ireland. It can refer to 
Curraheen, County Cork
Curraheen, County Kerry
Curraheen, County Tipperary (disambiguation)
Curraheen Park, a greyhound racing track in Bishopstown, County Cork, Ireland
Curraheen River, a river in County Cork, Ireland